Amphisbaena borelli is a species of worm lizard in the family Amphisbaenidae. The species is native to central South America.

Etymology
The specific name, borelli, is in honor of French-born Italian ornithologist Alfredo Borelli.

Geographic range
A. borelli is found in Argentina (Salta Province) and Bolivia (Santa Cruz Department and Tarija Department).

Habitat
The preferred habitats of A. borelli are forest and savanna.

Description
Dorsally, A. borelli is grayish brown, with each segment being darker in the center. Ventally, it is dirty white, without markings.

Reproduction
A. borelli is oviparous.

References

Further reading
Avila LJ, Martinez LE, Morando M (2013). "Checklist of lizards and amphisbaenians of Argentina: an update". Zootaxa 3616 (3): 201–238. (Cercolophia borelli). (in English, with an abstract in Spanish).
Gans C (1964). "The South American species of Amphisbaena with a vertically keeled tail (Reptilia, Amphisbaenidae)". Senckenbergiana biologica 45 (3/5): 387–416. (Amphisbaena steindachneri borellii, p. 397).
Peracca MG (1897). "Viaggio del Dott. Alfredo Borelli nel Chaco boliviano e nella Repubblica Argentina. Rettili ed Anfibi ". Bollettino dei Musei di Zoologia ed Anatomia comparata della R[egia]. Università di Torino 12 (274): 1–19. (Amphisbaena borelli, new species, pp. 8–9). (in Italian).

borelli
Reptiles described in 1897
Taxa named by Mario Giacinto Peracca